Pontoni is a surname. Notable people with the surname include:

Billy Pontoni (born 1954), Colombian musician
Camilo Pontoni (born 1995), Chilean footballer
Daniele Pontoni (born 1966), Italian cyclist
René Pontoni (1920–1983), Argentine footballer and manager